Lockyer is an electoral district of the Legislative Assembly in the Australian state of Queensland.

The district consists primarily of Gatton and Laidley Shires and northern parts of Beaudesert Shire. It includes the major town of Gatton and a number of smaller centres including Laidley, Helidon and Withcott. The eastern parts of the district are part of the outer southern suburbs of Ipswich and Brisbane in the area of Greenmount.

The district is bounded on the west by Toowoomba North, and Toowoomba South. On the southwest and south by Condamine, Southern Downs and Beaudesert. To the north and northwest by Nanango. To the northeast, where it passes south of Ipswich and Brisbane, it is bounded by Ipswich West, Ipswich, Moggill. To the east it shares a boundary with the seat of Logan.

The electorate has been represented by Jim McDonald since the 2017 election. Pauline Hanson came within just 114 votes of being elected at the 2015 election with a 49.78 percent two-candidate vote.

Hanson's subsequent election to the Senate in 2016 precluded her from running in Lockyer again in 2017.

Members for Lockyer

1 William Drayton Armstrong alternately listed his party alignment as Liberal, Opposition, and Ministeralist (twice). The parliamentary members' register does not list dates for these changes.

Election results

References

External links
 

Lockyer
Lockyer Valley Region